= Lalu Leela =

- Categories: Comic magazine
- Frequency: Fortnightly
- Country: India
- Based in: Kottayam, Kerala
- Language: Malayalam

Lalu Leela was a Malayalam children's magazine published in Kottayam, Kerala, by Manorajyam Publications.

The magazine is considered one of the pioneering children's magazines in Malayalam.
